China Rich Girlfriend is a satirical 2015 romantic comedy novel by Kevin Kwan. It is the sequel to Crazy Rich Asians, a novel about the wealthy Singapore elite. Kwan was urged to write the sequel by his publishers after the initial success of Crazy Rich Asians. The title refers to a line in the novel in which Nick's mother, Eleanor, exclaims over the wealth of the "China rich" who are billionaires, "These people aren't just everyday rich with a few hundred million.  They are China rich!" The novel was followed by a sequel, Rich People Problems in 2017.

Plot

Rachel Chu and Nicholas Young have repaired their relationship after her disastrous visit to his family, chronicled in Crazy Rich Asians. As a result of their engagement, Nicholas is estranged from his mother Eleanor and his grandmother. His aunt Jacqueline Ling informs him that in consequence of his planned marriage, he will find himself shut out of his family and his ancestral home, and warns him that this will be more intolerable than he anticipates.

In Crazy Rich Asians, Rachel learned that the man her mother had been married to in China was not her biological father, and that her mother does not know her real father's whereabouts or even what name he currently has. Rachel yearns to connect with him.

Carlton Bao, the only son of very wealthy Mainland Chinese parents, is a student in Britain. He crashes his Ferrari and is badly injured. His mother Bao Shaoyen, while lunching with Eleanor Young and some friends, shows them a photo of Carlton before the accident, and they realize he strongly resembles Rachel Chu. 

Nick's cousin Astrid has been reunited with her husband Michael, and their marriage is on a more even financial footing now that Michael's tech company is financially successful and her family respects him. However, Michael's prosperity does not make him even-tempered. Meanwhile Charlie Wu, Astrid's onetime fiancé who secretly engineered the success of Michael's firm in order to make Astrid happy, is struggling in his marriage with Isabel.

Kitty Pong, the former actress whose marriage to Bernard Tai brought her into the Singapore elite, tries to buy her way into the high society of Hong Kong by appearing in gossip magazines and buying high-profile art. However, she is socially clumsy. Finding herself continually shunned, she hires the services of Corinna Ko-Tung, a woman from a well-born family, who helps Kitty appear more sophisticated. 

Eleanor Young learns that her son and Rachel have settled on a wedding date and a location in California. Outraged, she pries more details from Astrid's young son and intrudes upon their wedding rehearsal. She informs Rachel that she has located her long-lost father, and she reconnects him with Rachel and her mother. Eleanor decides that she approves of Nick and Rachel's marriage, Nick is suspicious and asks her why she is reversing her position. She reveals it wasn't just because Rachel now associates with the wealthy elite of China, but also that Eleanor was trying to protect both him and Rachel from Su Yi's wrath. Years ago, she endured life as Su Yi's disapproved daughter-in-law due to Philip marrying her out of love. Rachel meets her father, Bao Gaoling, prior to the wedding, and is afterwards invited to spend time with his entire family in Shanghai during her honeymoon. Bao Shaoyen is angered by this and demands Bao Gaoling keep her away from her house. He places her in a fancy hotel and stalls any meeting for over a week, but Nick suspects mischief.

Carlton is also banned from associating with her, but decides to meet Rachel anyway, and quickly becomes close with her and Nick. He introduces her to his wealthy party-time friend Colette Bing. The four of them eventually travel to Paris for a shopping spree. At a party, Colette's boyfriend of three years, Richie Yang, proposes but she does not accept. He gets angry at Carlton; and the two begin a fight.

Rachel begins to feel upset she has only met her father once since reuniting. Colette and Rachel try to stop Carlton from a drag race against Richie. In anger, he accidentally tells Rachel that Bao Shaoyen refuses to let her into her household. Bao Shaoyen is in fear of losing her husband's political advantages for having an illegitimate child, and wishes to prevent Rachel from receiving Carlton's inheritance. Before leaving, Colette calls him a spoiled brat for hurting Rachel and tells him to go through with the race with Richie. Upon learning about his previous accident, Rachel convinces Carlton not to race Richie. In turn, Carlton apologizes to Rachel for his behavior.

Rachel decides to leave China, but returns for a spa weekend with her friend Peik Lin. However, at the spa, she becomes very ill and is placed under medical watch after experiencing mysterious organ failures. Peik Lin and Nick receive a bouquet of flowers with a note, saying that Rachel was poisoned with Tarquinioid, a rare poison, as a warning. The poison is extremely rare, and Carlton realizes that his parents' pharmaceutical company may be involved, as they recently acquired the rights to distribution of Tarquinioid. Believing Bao Shaoyen poisoned Rachel, he comes home to confront her about it and she denies involvement in the poisoning. Refusing to believe his mother, Carlton then confesses to his father about how she bribed everyone to cover up the truth of his accident as well as the other girl's death. However, when Rachel discovered the truth about the crash, he claims Shaoyen intentionally poisoned her in order to prevent her from causing a scandal. Carlton ends his confession stating that their family will face disgrace from the China Elite, but not by Rachel and him, but when the police come to arrest Shaoyen for his sister's poisoning. Now remorseful for how he's treated Rachel, Bao Gaoling visits her and Nick over in Hong Kong at Eddie's apartment. Apologizing, Gaoling confesses that Shaoyen has become cooperative with the police. He invites Rachel into his home, where she is introduced to the rest of his family who are all touched by her story. Bao Shaoyen finally meets Rachel and discovers how similar she looks to her son. She realizes her fears were misplaced and apologizes to her. In doing so, they start to get along.

The police discover that Colette's assistant Roxanne was behind the poisoning, which was done in response to Colette's tearful concerns that her inheritance would be reduced. Despite Colette's lack of knowledge to the situation, Carlton blames Colette and breaks up with her. Nick is hesitant, but Rachel agrees to meet with Colette and accepts her apology. Colette asks that Rachel help her and Carlton reconcile. Rachel does not want to get involved, and Colette becomes hysterical. She accuses Rachel of vindictively keeping them apart, and begins yelling at and berating her. Rachel responds by accusing Colette of being selfish. She points out that she learned to be content in having a loving supportive family and working hard in the real world. Rachel claims that Colette never knew how to be content. The argument ends when Rachel tells Colette to grow up. The incident is taped and becomes widely viewed on WeChat. Humiliated, Colette loses her sponsorship to a popular fashion designer label. This is made worse when she learns through the tabloids that her father, Jack, had been having an affair with Kitty behind her back.

Meanwhile, Astrid finds herself increasingly confiding in Charlie Wu after her husband becomes detached and cold. Michael gets interviewed by a magazine about his family, naming him Father of the Year after bragging about his accomplishments and showcasing his luxury items. The magazine then does research into Astrid Leong and publishes information about her lineage and wealth. This angers her family and he is forced to meet with her father, who berates him in front of a man Michael is trying to impress. The magazines are recalled and retracted from distribution, and Michael begins to believe that his company's situation is the result of Astrid's father's meddling. Astrid eventually realizes that the company was bought at a loss by Charlie so that Michael would feel more confident in the marriage. Michael confronts Astrid about her relationship with Charlie, revealing he has read her messages and threatening her with a weapon. Astrid takes control of the situation and escapes with her son. Later, it is revealed that Charlie Wu had divorced Isabel, and that he and Astrid have not left each other's sides all night.

Kitty Pong and Corinna Ko-Tung, her society consultant, have a problem: no one has seen Kitty's husband, Bernard Tai, in ages. There are rumors regarding his disappearance (he's dead, he's incapacitated, he's Kitty's sex slave somewhere in a dungeon) along with their daughter, Giselle. Kitty reveals to Corinna where Bernard is hiding: in a small house in Los Angeles while undergoing reconstructive surgery. He has dramatically changed from being in California for so long, and Giselle is forced to engage in his new and unfamiliar lifestyle. Kitty kidnaps her daughter and they escape using Jack Bing's private plane. She returns to her lavish house in Singapore with her daughter and reconnects her mother-in-law Carol Tai with her granddaughter, while beginning her lawsuit with Bernard for custody of Giselle.

Characters
Rachel Young (née Chu):  NYU professor who is engaged to and marries Nick Young. An American economist of Chinese descent who was raised by a single mother and had a humble upbringing. She is revealed to be connected to the upper class wealth after recently discovering that her biological dad is a Chinese billionaire.
Kerry Chu: Rachel's mother, who once had a romantic relationship with Bao Gaoliang.
Eleanor Young: Nick's mother who finally approves of Rachel after finding out that her father is a Chinese billionaire. 
Eddie Cheng: Nick's cousin who works in private banking, thanks to this he discovers Eleanor's secret account.
Goh Peik Lin: Rachel's rich Singaporean best friend whose family owns a property development and construction company, Near West Organization.
Nick Young: Rachel's husband and a member of the Singapore elite.
Bao Gaoling/Kao Wei: Carlton and Rachel's biological father who is a top Chinese politician and also a billionaire who owns a pharmaceutical company. Under his boyhood nickname, Kao Wei, he used to help Kerry whenever her drunkard husband got angry in their apartment building. They eventually fell for each other. Kerry never told him they had a child together.
Bao Shaoyen: Carlton's mother who has a hard time accepting Rachel, but later becomes a second mother to her. She has a gift room that consists of more than one hundred Hermès bags.
Carlton Bao: The 23-year-old English educated son of Bao Shaoyen and Bao Gaoliang who lives a very wild lifestyle. He is Rachel's paternal half-brother, and is "the spitting image of her."
Colette Bing: A famous fashion blogger and the spoiled daughter of either the third or fifth (depending on who is doing the ranking) richest men in China. She is a control freak and is Carlton's on-again, off-again unofficial girlfriend.
Mrs. Bing: Colette's germaphobic mother.  
Richie Yang: Son of a multi-billionaire father who's also one of the top richest men in China. He's one of Colette's suitors and also the one Colette's father wants her to marry. When she turns him down, he challenges Carlton to a race, which is later called off. 
Jack Bing: Colette's multi-billionaire father who insists her on marrying Richie, due to their equal multi-billionaire status. He is later revealed to have an affair with Kitty, which humiliates Colette.
Roxanne Ma: Colette's personal assistant, who is very loyal to her. She was Colette's 18th birthday present from her father, and is said to be the ultimate housekeeper. She is later revealed to have poisoned Rachel with Tarquinioid.
Michael Teo: Astrid's newly minted billionaire husband whose start-up company brings a huge success, due to unknowingly bought by Charlie. His success makes him cold and detatched, and later turns rageful, attempting to attack Astrid.
Charlie Wu: Astrid's billionaire former fiancé who still loves her, despite being married to Isabel Wu.
Astrid Teo (née Leong): Nick's fashionable cousin who is referred to as "The Goddess" and is known for her impeccable fashion sense. She secretly still loves Charlie and the feeling deepens even more when Michael turns cruel, due to his newfound success and wealth.
Bernard Tai: Kitty's estranged billionaire husband who's been hiding in California due to depression after a mix-up on his plastic surgery. He engages Giselle (his daughter with Kitty) in his strange activities and doesn't want Kitty involved in their lives, believing it's better she stays in Hong Kong. Bernard finds himself in a high-profile international custody battle for full custody of Giselle from Kitty.
Kitty Tai (née Pong): Bernard's wife who is a former soap-star (and rumored porn-star) turned social climber. She has a daughter named Giselle, whom she's worried about due to Bernard's strange raising and lack of having her involved in their family's life. With Corinna's help, she kidnaps their daughter and escapes to a lavish home in Singapore. Revealing herself as the lover of Jack Bing, Kitty sues Bernard for custody of Giselle.
Corinna Ko-Tung: A woman coming from a well-bred family who helps Kitty in her social-climbing agenda. Upon learning Bernard's intentions to cut Kitty out of Giselle's life, Corinna helps her kidnap her daughter and escape to a lavish home in Singapore.
Datin Carol Tai: A devout Christian who is the wife of a corrupt billionaire, Dato' Tai Toh Lui. She is one of Eleanor's best friends. She has a granddaughter, Giselle, whom she reconnects with after Kitty returns to Singapore.

Reception
The novel received positive reviews and was noted in The Washington Post as "the year's best beach reading," as well as excerpted in Vanity Fair. Anne Kingston of Maclean's wrote of the novel, "Kevin Kwan’s sequel to the bestselling Crazy Rich Asians is perhaps even more delicious than the first."

Film adaptation

Time reported on August 15, 2018 that Kwan has been tasked with developing the sequel to Crazy Rich Asians from his follow-up novel China Rich Girlfriend. The planning is still in pre-production as of August 2018, with several of the key actors currently committed to other projects until 2020. Director Jon Chu was also already committed to shoot the film adaptation of In the Heights, which was scheduled for release in June 2021.

Awkwafina was interviewed in January 2019 and indicated that there were still no scripts for the sequel and that production filming had not started. According to Town and Country magazine, the filming and premiere of the film is not scheduled to take place until 2020. According to a Slash film journal article, the two sequels, including Rich People Problems, will be shot back-to-back in 2020 once the filming commences. Shooting is expected to be delayed until at least the end of 2020. Screenwriter Adele Lim declined to work on the sequels because of an equal-pay inequity dispute during negotiations in fall 2018. Color Force had hired the experienced Peter Chiarelli to write the screenplay for the Crazy Rich Asians adaptation; when Chu joined the original production, he brought Lim on to add authentic details from Singapore and Malaysia. For the sequels, Warner Brothers had initially offered Lim a salary approximately th of Chiarelli's pay; although they later made an offer closer in parity to Chiarelli's, who had offered to split his fee with Lim, Lim declined.

On April 29, 2019, CNBC reported that Harry Shum Jr. is to be cast in the role of playing Astrid's previous boyfriend in the sequel to Crazy Rich Asians, stating, "Shum will play Charlie Wu, the former flame of Astrid Young Teo (played by Gemma Chan), cousin of lead character Nick Young, in China Rich Girlfriend, which is currently in pre-production." The sequel film is expected to focus on the relationship between Charlie and Astrid, the search for Rachel's father, and Kitty Pong.

See also
 Chinese people in New York City
 Overseas Chinese
 Chinese Singaporeans

References

Novels set in China
Novels set in Singapore
Novels set in Hong Kong
2015 American novels
Chick lit novels
Sequel novels
Doubleday (publisher) books